The Danish Under 21 Individual Speedway Championship is a competition for riders who are under the age of 21, holding a Danish passport and a valid DMU licence. The competition was first staged in 1960 and was won by Jorgen Hoffman. Although there was no competition in 1961, the event returned in 1962 and has been staged every year since. Kenneth Bjerre holds the record for most titles with four.

Previous winners

References

See also
 Danish Speedway League
 Danish Individual Speedway Championship

Denmark
Speedway in Denmark